James R. Griesemer is an American professor of philosophy at the University of California, Davis in Davis, California specializing in philosophy of biology.

Education and career

Griesemer received his PhD in 1983 in the Conceptual Foundations of Science at the University of Chicago under the supervision of William C. Wimsatt.  He joined the faculty at University of California, Davis in 1984, and has taught there ever since.  He is currently a "Distinguished Professor."

He was President of the International Society for the History, Philosophy, and Social Studies of Biology (ISHPSSB) from 2007 to 2009.

Philosophical work

His research focuses on the history and philosophy of biology, including models and practices in museum-based natural history, laboratory-based ecology, units of inheritance and selection in evolutionary biology, and visual representation in embryology and genetics.

References

External links

Griesemer's faculty page
Griesemer's publications

Philosophers of science
Philosophy academics
Philosophers of biology
University of Chicago alumni
University of California, Davis faculty
Living people
Year of birth missing (living people)